Donald Maclean, 3rd Laird of Brolas (c. 1670–1725) was the Laird of Brolas.

Biography
His father, Lauchlan Maclean, 2nd Laird of Brolas, died at an early age. Donald entered the army and served for some time as lieutenant during the reign of Queen Anne; but in the attempt made by her brother for the recovery of the crown of his ancestors, in 1715, Maclean of Brolass served as lieutenant-colonel under his cousin, Sir John Maclean, 4th Baronet, at the Battle of Sheriffmuir, where he received two severe wounds on the head from a trooper's saber.

He was married to Isabella, daughter of Allan MacLean, 10th Laird of Ardgour. They had the following children:
Sir Allan Maclean, 6th Baronet; 4th Laird of Brolas; and 22nd Clan Chief of Clan Maclean
Catherine Maclean, married to Lachlan, son of Donald Maclean of Coll
Isabella Maclean, married to John Maclean of Lochbuie
Anna Maclean, married to Allan Maclean of Drimnin

Donald also had a natural, or illegitimate son, called Gillian Maclean, who became a lieutenant in Guernsey, was married, and had issue. Donald died in 1725, and was succeeded by his son, Sir Allan Maclean, 6th Baronet, who became the Fourth Laird of Maclean, and on the death of his third cousin, Sir Hector Maclean, 5th Baronet in 1750 became the 6th Baronet and 22nd Clan Chief.

Ancestors

References

Donald
Scottish clan chiefs
Donald
People of the Jacobite rising of 1715
1725 deaths
Year of birth uncertain